The two-barred warbler (Phylloscopus plumbeitarsus) is a bird of the leaf warbler family (Phylloscopidae). The species was first described by Robert Swinhoe in 1861. It was formerly included in the "Old World warbler" assemblage. It is closely related to the greenish warbler, to which it was formerly considered conspecific.

It is found in northern Mongolia, Manchuria and southern Siberia.

References

two-barred warbler
Birds of North Asia
Birds of Mongolia
Birds of Manchuria
two-barred warbler